Lubomír David (born 17 February 1964) is a Czech wrestler. He competed in the men's Greco-Roman 130 kg at the 1988 Summer Olympics.

References

1964 births
Living people
Czech male sport wrestlers
Olympic wrestlers of Czechoslovakia
Wrestlers at the 1988 Summer Olympics
Place of birth missing (living people)